Ethiopia competed at the 1964 Summer Olympics in Tokyo, Japan. Twelve competitors, all men, took part in eleven events in three sports. Abebe Bikila repeated as Olympic champion in the men's marathon.

Medalists

Athletics

Boxing

Cycling

Four cyclists represented Ethiopia in 1964.

 Individual road race
 Mikael Saglimbeni
 Fisihasion Ghebreyesus
 Suleman Ambaye
 Yemane Negassi

 Team time trial
 Suleman Ambaye
 Fisihasion Ghebreyesus
 Yemane Negassi
 Mikael Saglimbeni

References

External links
Official Olympic Reports
International Olympic Committee results database

1964 in Ethiopian sport
Nations at the 1964 Summer Olympics
1964 Summer Olympics